María Méndez Fernández (born 10 April 2001) is a Spanish professional footballer who plays as a centre back for Liga F club Levante UD, where she serves as fourth captain, and the Spain women's national team.

Club career

Oviedo Moderno/Real Oviedo: (2014–2019) 
Méndez began playing for Oviedo Moderno's youth teams at 13, and eventually moved up to their B team. At 15, she made her debut for Oviedo's senior team, and for the 2016–17 season, she made the jump to the first team, which was relegated to the Segunda División in the previous season. Around this time, Méndez began to play as a midfielder, which she would continue to do before leaving for Deportivo de La Coruña.

In the 2017–18 season, Méndez won Group 1 of the Segunda División with Oviedo. They advanced to promotion playoffs for the Primera División, but were knocked out 1–2 on aggregate by EdF Logroño. After Méndez won the 2018 FIFA U-17 Women's World Cup with Spain, she was honored at the Estadio Carlos Tartiere, and Oviedo released a statement hailing her as a "club legend."

While at Oviedo, Méndez was given the nickname "Pecas," meaning "freckles" in Spanish. Later on in her time at Oviedo, Méndez became one of the club's captains.

Deportivo la Coruña: (2019–2020) 
On 17 June, 2019, Méndez joined newly-promoted Deportivo de La Coruña with a one-year deal upon the expiration of her contract with Oviedo. In her first season playing in the Spanish top flight, she made 20 league appearances and scored 4 goals as the club finished in 6th place.

Levante UD: (2020– ) 
On 24 June, 2020, Méndez joined Levante UD on a three-year deal. In her first season at Levante, Méndez played all but two of Levante's league matches as they finished third in the Primera División, qualifying for the UEFA Women's Champions League for the first time in 12 years. She also played in each match of Levante's runner-up 2020–21 Copa de la Reina campaign. In the quarterfinals of the tournament, Méndez scored both goals in a 2–1 win against UDG Tenerife to send Levante through to the semifinals. After beating Atlético Madrid in extra time, Méndez played the first Copa de la Reina final of her career as Levante lost 4–2 to FC Barcelona.

Ahead of the 2021–22 season, Méndez was given the role of Levante's fourth captain. She made her debut in the UEFA Women's Champions League with a win against Celtic in the first qualifying round, and Levante advanced to the final round after defeating Rosenborg BK. Levante faced Olympique Lyonnais in the final round of qualifying and lost 4–2 on aggregate, ending their Champions League season.

International career
Méndez was a regular starter in Spain's U17 team that won the 2018 UEFA Women's Under-17 Championship, which qualified them for the 2018 FIFA U-17 Women's World Cup.

On 2 November, 2018, Méndez was called up to play in the 2018 FIFA U-17 Women's World Cup. She started all of Spain's matches in the tournament, and on 1 December, 2018, Méndez started the final of the final against Mexico, which ended in a 2–1 victory for Spain. Spain's U17s became the first Spanish team to win a Women's World Cup in any age category.

In 2019, Méndez was given her first call-up to Spain's U-19 women's national team.

Méndez made her senior debut on 11 November 2022, starting in a 7-0 friendly home win over Argentina.

Personal life
Méndez is the younger sister of Miguel Méndez, a former player of Real Oviedo's youth teams and the former coach of Real Oviedo Femenino.

Honors

Club
Oviedo Moderno/Real Oviedo
 Segunda Division, Group I: Winner, 2017-18

International
Spain U17
 UEFA Women's Under-17 Championship: Winner, 2018
 FIFA U-17 Women's World Cup: Winner, 2018

References

External links
 Profile at La Liga

2001 births
Living people
Footballers from Oviedo
Spanish women's footballers
Women's association football defenders
Real Oviedo (women) players
Deportivo de La Coruña (women) players
Levante UD Femenino players
Primera División (women) players
Spain women's youth international footballers
Spain women's international footballers
21st-century Spanish women